Willema formosa, the beautiful sylph, is a species of butterfly in the family Hesperiidae. It is found in Malawi, Zambia, the Democratic Republic of the Congo, Tanzania, Kenya, Ethiopia, Uganda and Tanzania. The habitat consists of forest edges.

Subspecies
Willema formosa formosus (Malawi)
Willema formosa linda Evans, 1937 - northern Zambia, Democratic Republic of the Congo: Shaba, western Tanzania, western Kenya
Willema formosa mittoni Carcasson, 1961 - southern Ethiopia
Willema formosa nyanza Evans, 1937 - Uganda, Democratic Republic of the Congo: east to Kivu, north-western Tanzania

References

Butterflies described in 1894
Heteropterinae
Butterflies of Africa